Scouting in Kansas has a long history, from the 1910s to the present day, serving thousands of youth in programs that suit the environment in which they live.

Early history (1910−1950)

The Brewer Scout Cabin in Solomon is on the National Register of Historic Places.

Mrs. Fern E. Sears was the organizer of the first Kansas City, Kansas council of Girl Scouts and author of a book on Christian symbols, "Let Me Speak".  She trained Girl Scout leaders and established troops in Kansas City, Kansas in 1948 when the area qualified for a council, called the Santa Fe Trail council.  Mrs. Sears was named first president, and was an honorary life president at the time of her death on August 24, 1959.

Recent history (1950−1990)
In 1958 the National Order of the Arrow Conference was held at the University of Kansas.

Scouting in Kansas today
There are seven Boy Scouts of America (BSA) local councils in Kansas.

Coronado Area Council

Coronado Area Council serves north central and northwest Kansas, across 32 counties, with headquarters in Salina.

Heart of America Council

Heart of America Council serves Scouts in Missouri and Kansas.

Jayhawk Area Council

In 1928 the Topeka Council took over 39 counties across northern Kansas and became the Jayhawk Area Council.

Buffalo District
Pony Express District
Shunga District
Sojadi District
Sunflower District

Camps
The Jayhawk Area Council operates the 340 acre Falley Scout Reservation, which is divided into Camp Jayhawk (Scouts BSA Summer Camp) and Camp Delaware (Cub Scout Programs).

Ozark Trails Council

Ozark Trails Council serves Scouts in Missouri and Kansas.

Pony Express Council

The Pony Express Council is based in Saint Joseph, Missouri, and also serves Scouts in Kansas.

Quivira Council

Quivira Council serves youth in south central Kansas, with headquarters in Wichita. Kansa Lodge #198, Order of the Arrow serves local Arrowmen. They currently operate two camps: Camp Kanza (Cub Scouts and Webelos), which provides the name for their Lodge; and Quivira Scout Ranch (Scouts BSA and Venturers), at which they host their largest summer camp program each summer, and offer Black Jack Trail, an introduction to backpacking, twice a year.

High Plains District
Kanza District
Osage Nation District
Pawnee District
South Winds District
White Buffalo District

The Quivira Council website http://www.quivira.org/ has links to each district.

Santa Fe Trail Council
Santa Fe Trail Council includes nineteen counties in southwestern Kansas, with headquarters in Garden City.

Spanish Peaks Scout Ranch

The Spanish Peaks Scout Ranch (SPSR) is located near Walsenburg, Colorado and borders the Spanish Peaks Wilderness. It is a local council camp of the Santa Fe Trail Council based out of Garden City. The camp gives program geared toward outdoor education such as wilderness backpacking, climbing, and outdoor skills.

Spanish Peaks Staff Association

Spanish Peaks Staff Association (SPSA) is a non-profit organization dedicated to connecting current, former, and honorary staffers of Spanish Peaks Scout Ranch (SPSR). The organization was formed by like-minded staff alumni committed to the continued support of SPSR and the love of outdoor education for youth.  Although the Spanish Peaks Staff Association is not an alumni association the members have all worked with this Scout camp and are dedicated toward outdoor education for youth.

Purpose

The Spanish Peaks Staff Association, although still in their infant stages, has adapted the purposes of:

(a) Demonstrating support for Spanish Peaks Scout Ranch and its continued value in the future.
(b) Providing vision and leadership for Spanish Peaks Scout Ranch.
(c) Raising volunteer and financial support for Spanish Peaks Scout Ranch improvement endeavors.
(d) Establishing an endowment that will guarantee the future stability of the SPSR independently of Santa Fe Trail Council operations.
(e) Establishing an endowment that insures continued funding of a full-time ranger at Spanish Peaks Scout Ranch.
(f) Providing a forum for past, present, and future staffers to gather, share ideas, and stay in contact.

Structure
The Spanish Peaks Staff Association (SPSA) is independent of the Santa Fe Trail Council and Spanish Peaks Scout Ranch. They are, however, dedicated to the youth of southwest Kansas and promotion of outdoor education. The organization was chartered in 2006 as a response to a struggling economy and the Santa Fe Trail Council's Board deficit. The lack of the council's ability to secure funds for operating expenses led to SPSA's motivation and primary goal of securing funds separate of the council.

Buffalo Range District
Cimarron District
High Plains District

Girl Scouting in Kansas

There are three Girl Scout councils in Kansas.

Girl Scouts of Kansas Heartland

The Girl Scouts of Kansas Heartland serves more than 16,000 girls and nearly 5,000 adult volunteers in 80 counties in Kansas.

It was formed by the merger of six councils in 2008:
Girl Scouts of Central Kansas,
Girl Scout Council of The Flint Hills,
Girl Scouts of Sunflower Council,
Girl Scouts Wheatbelt Council,
Girl Scouts of Tumbleweed Council, and
Girl Scouts of The Golden Plains Council

Headquarters: Wichita, Kansas

Website: http://www.girlscoutskansasheartland.org

Camps:
Camp Four Winds near Leon, Kansas.  It has a  lake.

Girl Scouts Missouri Heartland

Girl Scouts of Missouri Heartland is mostly based in Missouri but serves girls in southeastern Kansas (Bourbon, Cherokee, and Crawford counties) and northeastern Oklahoma.  See Scouting in Missouri for more information.

Headquarters: Springfield, Missouri

Website: http://www.girlscoutsrscmo.org

One of its camps is located in Kansas:
Camp Friendship Fields in Crawford County

Girl Scouts of Northeast Kansas and Northwest Missouri

Girl Scouts of Northeast Kansas and Northwest Missouri supports girls in many Kansas counties: Atchison, Anderson, Brown, Clay, Doniphan, Douglas, Geary, Franklin, Jackson, Jefferson, Johnson, Leavenworth, Linn, Marshall, Miami, Nemaha, Pottawatomie, Riley, Shawnee, Wabaunsee, Washington and Wyandotte.

It was established on August 1, 2007, with a merger of several other councils including Girl Scouts of Kaw Valley Council headquartered in Kansas.

See Scouting in Missouri for full information.

Headquarters: Kansas City, Missouri

Website: http://www.girlscoutsksmo.org

Camps in Kansas include:
Camp Cutteru is near Junction City, Kansas
Camp Timberlake was  near Stilwell, Kansas, but was sold to private owners in the mid-2010s.  It is still used as a scouting camp by reservation with the new owners.
Tongawood Program center is  near Tonganoxie, Kansas

Scouting museums in Kansas
Central States Scout Museum, Larned, Kansas

See also

Roy Williams (Scouting)
Tribe of Mic-O-Say

References

External links

 Spanish Peaks Staff Association
 Spanish Peaks Scout Ranch
 Coronado Area Council
 Jayhawk Area Council
 Quivira Council
 Santa Fe Trail Council

Youth organizations based in Kansas
Kansas
Central Region (Boy Scouts of America)